Picture bible or Picture Bible may refer to:
Bible moralisée, a form of Medieval illustrated bible
The Picture Bible, 1978, a comic-strip version of the Christian bible